East Sanford Historic District is a national historic district located at Sanford, Lee County, North Carolina. It encompasses 135 contributing buildings and 1 contributing site in a predominantly residential section of Sanford.  The district includes notable examples of Colonial Revival, Queen Anne, and Bungalow / American Craftsman style architecture, with buildings largely dated between 1894 and 1960.  Notable buildings include the East Sanford Graded School, Sanford Congregational Christian Church (1904; 1924; 1949), Deaton-Makepeace House (c. 1900), and Sanford Chapel (1940s).

It was listed on the National Register of Historic Places in 2010.

References

Historic districts on the National Register of Historic Places in North Carolina
Colonial Revival architecture in North Carolina
Queen Anne architecture in North Carolina
Buildings and structures in Lee County, North Carolina
National Register of Historic Places in Lee County, North Carolina